Xubyarlı (also, Khubyarly and Khub”yarly) is a village and municipality in the Imishli Rayon of Azerbaijan.  It has a population of 1,082.

References 

Populated places in Imishli District